Eric S. Jones (November 27, 1914 – October 30, 1982) was an educator, magistrate and politician in Newfoundland. He represented Burin in the Newfoundland House of Assembly from 1956 to 1966 and Fogo from 1966 to 1971.

The son of Mark and Deborah Jones, he was born in Fogo and was educated there and at Memorial University. From 1930 to 1940, he taught school at Seldom Come By, Bay St. George and Bay of Islands. He was principal of the International Grenfell Association boarding school in Cartwright, Labrador. From 1940 to 1944, he was field secretary of the Canadian Legion educational service in Newfoundland. In 1944, he was named magistrate at Harbour Breton and, in 1955, at Grand Bank. In 1956, he was named to the South Coast Commission.

Jones married Nina Smith; the couple had four children.

He was elected to the Newfoundland assembly in 1956 and was reelected in 1959, 1962 and was elected for Fogo in 1966. He served in the Newfoundland cabinet as Minister of Highways and then as Minister of Finance. He resigned from politics in October 1971, when he was named chair of the Newfoundland Civil Service commission. He died in St. John's at the age of 67.

References 

1914 births
1982 deaths
People from Fogo Island, Newfoundland and Labrador
Memorial University of Newfoundland alumni
Liberal Party of Newfoundland and Labrador MHAs
Members of the Executive Council of Newfoundland and Labrador